NK = Not known

See also
List of Anglican churches in the United Kingdom
List of Catholic churches in the United Kingdom

References

Cathedrals in the United Kingdom